Peter Gavin was a Northern Irish football left back who played in the Football League for Blackpool.

References

Association footballers from Northern Ireland
NIFL Premiership players
Association football fullbacks
Year of birth missing
Place of birth missing
Cliftonville F.C. players
English Football League players
Blackpool F.C. players
Northern Ireland amateur international footballers